NGC 4033 is an elliptical galaxy located in the constellation Corvus. It was discovered on 31 December 1785, by William Herschel.

References

External links 
 

Elliptical galaxies
4033
Corvus (constellation)